Filmtracks 2000 is the thirteenth album by American composer Bill Laswell, released on September 25, 2001 by Tzadik Records. Despite the title's suggestion, the album is not a collection of Laswell's film scores. Instead it is an assemblage of new compositions which contain the hallmarks of soundtrack music, drawing influences from the music of India, Asia and the Middle East.

Track listing

Personnel 
Adapted from the Filmtracks 2000 liner notes.
Musicians
Ginger Baker – drums
Karl Berger – musical arrangements
Aïyb Dieng – talking drum, percussion
Tata Güines – instruments
Graham Haynes – cornet
Jonas Hellborg – acoustic bass guitar, fretless bass guitar, Wal MIDI bass
Bill Laswell – bass guitar, six-string bass, fretless bass guitar, drum programming, keyboards, effects
Nicky Skopelitis – six-string guitar, twelve-string guitar, bağlama, coral sitar, Fairlight CMI
Omar Faruk Tekbilek – ney, zurna
Jah Wobble – bass guitar
Bernie Worrell – Hammond organ
Technical personnel
Heung-Heung Chin – cover art
Robert Musso – engineering
Allan Tucker – mastering

Release history

References

External links 
 

2001 albums
Bill Laswell albums
Albums produced by Bill Laswell
Tzadik Records albums